Lukáš Škrečko (born July 17, 1987) is a Slovak former professional ice hockey goaltender. He played in the Tipsport Liga for HKM Zvolen and HK Dukla Trenčín.

External links

1987 births
Living people
Les Aigles de Nice players
HC 07 Detva players
HK Dukla Trenčín players
Slovak ice hockey goaltenders
Sportspeople from Banská Bystrica
HKM Zvolen players
Slovak expatriate ice hockey players in the Czech Republic
Slovak expatriate sportspeople in France
Expatriate ice hockey players in France